Arformoterol, sold under the brand name Brovana among others, is a medication used for the treatment of chronic obstructive pulmonary disease (COPD).

It is a long-acting β2 adrenoreceptor agonist (LABA) and it is the active (R,R)-(−)-enantiomer of formoterol. It was approved for medical use in the United States in October 2006. It is available as a generic medicine.

Medical uses 
Arformoterol is indicated for the maintenance treatment of bronchoconstriction in people with chronic obstructive pulmonary disease (COPD).

References

External links 
 
 

Beta2-adrenergic agonists
Drugs acting on the respiratory system
Enantiopure drugs
Phenol ethers
Phenols
Substituted amphetamines
Formamides
Phenylethanolamines